Free Party Salzburg (FPS) was a political party in Austria active in the State of Salzburg.

History
The FPS was established in June 2015 as a split from the Freedom Party of Austria (FPÖ). Prior to the split conflicts had occurred between the FPÖ's federal party leader Heinz-Christian Strache and the former chairman of the Salzburg state branch Karl Schnell.

On 9 June 2015, Strache quickly expelled the previous acting as national party chairman Rupert Doppler from the FPÖ. Five of the six FPÖ MPs in Salzburg Parliament, as well as two Members of Parliament and a Federal Councillor joined. Between the FPS and the FPÖ's remaining Salzburg state branch, a conflict over the party name and the allocation of subsidies developed. Initially called Freiheitliche Partei Salzburgs ("Freedom Party of Salzburg"), the party had to change its name after a court had ruled that it was too similar to the FPÖ's name. In the 2017 Austrian legislative election the party participated nationwide as Free List Austria (Freie Liste Österreich/FLÖ).

Political positions
For the legislative election 2017, the FLÖ has set three main goals: stopping Islamic immigration, introducing direct democracy and exiting the European Union.

References

External links
Official Website 

2015 establishments in Austria
Direct democracy parties
Eurosceptic parties in Austria
Freedom Party of Austria breakaway groups
Political parties established in 2015
Political parties disestablished in 2019
Defunct political parties in Austria
Right-wing populist parties